Henry Mayer (died July 2000) was an American historian who was best known as a biographer of abolitionist William Lloyd Garrison. Mayer lived in Berkeley, California. He died at age 59 of a heart attack while bicycling in Glacier National Park, Montana.

References

External links

2000 deaths
American historians
People from Berkeley, California